Orlando Enrique Berrío Meléndez (born 14 February 1991) is a Colombian professional footballer who plays as a winger or forward for Campeonato Brasileiro Série A club América Mineiro. He also represented Colombia national football team in six international appearances.

Club career
Born in Cartagena, Berrío played for Expreso Rojo and Atlético Nacional as a youth. He made his first team – and Categoría Primera A – debut on 22 February 2009, starting in a 0–1 home loss against Deportes Quindío.

Berrío scored his first professional goal on 8 April 2010, in a 2–0 home win against América de Cali. Three days later, he netted a brace in an away success over Cortuluá, for the same scoreline.

Sparingly used, Berrío was loaned to fellow top tier club Millonarios on 3 January 2012. On 3 August 2012, after failing to score a single goal for the club, he was loaned to Patriotas for one year.

Returning to Nacional, Berrío was regularly utilized by new manager Juan Carlos Osorio.

Flamengo
On 27 January 2017, Flamengo agreed to pay US$3.5 million to Atlético Nacional to sign Berrío. Berrío debuted for Flamengo in a Primeira Liga match against Grêmio on 8 February 2017, replacing Federico Mancuello in the 62nd minute and scoring his first goal for his new club in the 78th minute, while Flamengo won 2–0.

On 22 October 2017, in a Brazilian Série A match against São Paulo at Pacaembu Stadium, Berrío suffered a knee injury that later was confirmed as an anterior cruciate ligament injury. In the same week, he underwent surgery, causing him to miss the rest of the 2017 season.

Khor Fakkan
On 19 July 2020, Berrío signed with Khor Fakkan .

América Mineiro
After spending an entire year without playing at Khor Fakkan, Berrío signed with América Mineiro on 12 July 2021.

International career
In August 2016, Berrío was named in Colombia's squad for 2018 FIFA World Cup qualifiers against Venezuela and Brazil. He did not play in either match, and only made his full international debut on 6 October, coming on as a substitute for Juan Cuadrado in a 1–0 away win against Paraguay.

Career statistics

Club

International

Honours

Club
Atlético Nacional
Categoría Primera A: 2011–I, 2013–II, 2014–I, 2015–II
Copa Colombia: 2013, 2016
Superliga Colombiana: 2016
Copa Libertadores: 2016

Flamengo
Campeonato Brasileiro Série A: 2019
Campeonato Carioca: 2017, 2019, 2020
Copa Libertadores: 2019
Supercopa do Brasil: 2020
Recopa Sudamericana: 2020

References

External links

1991 births
Living people
Sportspeople from Cartagena, Colombia
Colombian footballers
Association football wingers
Association football forwards
Categoría Primera A players
Atlético Nacional footballers
Millonarios F.C. players
Patriotas Boyacá footballers
CR Flamengo footballers
Khor Fakkan Sports Club players
América Futebol Clube (MG) players
Campeonato Brasileiro Série A players
Copa Libertadores-winning players
Colombia under-20 international footballers
Colombia international footballers
Expatriate footballers in Brazil
Colombian expatriate sportspeople in Brazil
Expatriate footballers in the United Arab Emirates